Pasiphila subcinctata is a moth in the family Geometridae. It is found in the Russian Far East (Amur, Primorye, Sakhalin), Korea and Japan.

References

Moths described in 1915
subcinctata
Moths of Japan